Regonda is a mandal and a mandal in Jayashankar Bhupalpally district in the state of Telangana, India. It has buildings from the period of the Kakatiya dynasty.

Regonda mandal comprises 49 villages and 27 panchayats. Jamshedbaigpet is the smallest village and Regonda is the biggest, with the remainder being:

 Bhagirthipet
 Chennapur
 Chinnakodepaka
 Dammannapet
 Jaggaiahpet
 Kanaparthy
 Kodavatancha
 Konaraopet
 Kothapallegori
Pochampally
 Lingala
 Madathapalle
 Ponagandla
 Ramannaguda
 Repaka
 Sultanpur
 Tirumalagiri
 Damaranchapally 
 Gudepalle  
 Kanaparthy   
Narayanapur   
Nizampalli   
Rajakkapally 
Ranagaiahpalli    
Regonda
Repaka Palli  
Roopireddi Palli
Royapalli   
Sulthanpur

Bus stations 
Rangaiahpally
Pochampally road
Lingala X Road
Sri Narasimha Swamy Temple(kodavatancha)
Repaka
Regonda
Chennapur/Roopireddy palli

References 

Mandals in Jayashankar Bhupalpally district
Villages in Jayashankar Bhupalpally district